Testico is a comune (municipality) in the Province of Savona in the Italian region Liguria, located about  southwest of Genoa and about  southwest of Savona.

Testico borders the following municipalities: Casanova Lerrone, Cesio, Chiusanico, and Stellanello.

Demographic evolution

References

Cities and towns in Liguria